The Bryant Building is a 26-story office building located at the corner of 11th and Grand Avenue in Kansas City, Missouri. Completed in 1931, it is considered a distinctive example of Art Deco architecture in Kansas City. It was placed on the Kansas City Register of Historic Places listed on September 27, 1979 and was listed on the National Register of Historic Places in 1989.

The Bryant Building was designed by the Chicago firm of Graham, Anderson, Probst & White. The design is an adaptation of Eliel Saarinen's second-place design in the 1922 Chicago Tribune Tower design competition. Along with the former Federal Reserve Bank building, it is one of only two buildings designed by Graham, Anderson, Probst, and White in Kansas City.

The cornerstone of the building contains family records placed there by the heirs of Dr. John Bryant. Bryant and his wife, Henrietta, received the land the building sits on as a wedding gift from her father in 1866. The original Bryant Building was built in 1891 at the corner of Petticoat Lane and Grand Boulevard, before being razed in 1931 and rebuilt as the current building. The original building, designed by Van Brunt and Howe of Kansas City, was highlighted in Architectural Review as "one of the best lighted and ventilated office buildings in" the city.

Today the building is used as a "carrier hotel", housing multiple web servers to help power the fiber-optic internet in the city. The building underwent a $7 million renovation to improve power and cooling systems in order to fulfill its new role.

Architecture
The Bryant Building won both the Kansas City Business League and the local American Institute of Architects Chapter awards in 1931.

Construction
Commissioned to replace an existing seven-story Bryant building on the same site, construction on what newspapers dubbed "Bryant tower" began in 1930 and was completed in 1931. The builder was Thompson-Starrett of Chicago.

The Bryant Building is steel frame with concrete foundation. It sits on a three-story granite base, above which it is faced with brick and terra cotta.

References 

National Register of Historic Places in Kansas City, Missouri
Office buildings in Kansas City, Missouri
Office buildings on the National Register of Historic Places in Missouri
Office buildings completed in 1931
Downtown Kansas City
Art Deco architecture in Missouri